Mimopeus is a genus of darkling beetles in the family Tenebrionidae, first described by Pascoe in 1866.

Species
These 23 species belong to the genus Mimopeus.

 Mimopeus buchanani Broun, 1880
 Mimopeus clarkei Watt, 1988
 Mimopeus convexus Watt, 1988
 Mimopeus costellus Broun, 1905
 Mimopeus elongatus Breme, 1842
 Mimopeus granulosus Breme, 1842
 Mimopeus humeralis Bates, 1873
 Mimopeus impressifrons Bates, 1873
 Mimopeus insularis Watt, 1988
 Mimopeus johnsi Watt, 1988
 Mimopeus lateralis Broun, 1909
 Mimopeus lewisianus Sharp, 1903
 Mimopeus neglectus Watt, 1988
 Mimopeus opaculus Bates, 1873
 Mimopeus parallelus Watt, 1988
 Mimopeus parvus Watt, 1988
 Mimopeus pascoei Bates, 1873
 Mimopeus rugosus Bates, 1873
 Mimopeus subcostatus Sharp, 1903
 Mimopeus thoracicus Bates, 1873
 Mimopeus tibialis Bates, 1873
 Mimopeus turbotti Watt, 1988
 Mimopeus vallis Watt, 1988

References

External links

 

Tenebrionidae
Tenebrionidae genera